A list of animated feature films first released in 1989.

Highest-grossing animated films of the year

See also
 List of animated television series of 1989

Notes

References

 Feature films
1989
1989-related lists